Pseudomelaniidae is an extinct family of fossil sea snails, marine gastropod mollusks in the clade Caenogastropoda.

Genera
Genera within the family Pseudomelaniidae include:
 Angulasina Gründel, 2012
 Bourgetia Terquem & Jourdy, 1870
 Fusoidella Wenz, 1938
 Hudlestonella Cossmann, 1909
 Liocium Gabb, 1869
 Malbalnella Korotkov, 1994
 Mesospira Cossmann, 1892
 Paosia Böhm, 1895
 Pericarinata Pan, 1982
 Pseudomelania Pictet & Campiche, 1862 - the type genus
 Ramina - synonym: Rama Böhm, 1895
 Ramina ptychitica Kittl, 1894

References

External links